The  is cluster of small kofun burial mounds located in the Ono neighborhood of the town of Ōno, Ibi District, Gifu Prefecture in the Chūbu region of Japan. The site was designated a National Historic Site of Japan in 1957.

Overview
The kofun group is located in the northwestern corner of the Nōbi Plain in northwestern Gifu Prefecture, surrounded by rice fields and orchards. In a roughly one square kilometer area, there were once over 200 tumuli, of which 14 theoretically received protection in 1957 as a National Historic Site. These included 27 keyhole-shaped tumuli, which are shaped like a keyhole, having one square end and one circular end, when viewed from above, or the similarly-shaped "scallop-type" kofun ).  At present, only nine remain; with the others being destroyed for expansion of farm land. Of these remaining nine, eight have been excavated, and from the grave goods recovered (haniwa, bronze mirrors, horse fittings, iron and wooden implements, iron swords and spearheads), were determined to date to the middle of the 5th century to the early part of the 6th century AD.  One of the bronze mirrors is kept at the Gotoh Museum in Tokyo. The site is about eight minutes by car from Motosu Station on the Tarumi Railway Tarumi Line.

See also
List of Historic Sites of Japan (Gifu)

References

External links

Ono town home page 
Gifu Prefectural home page 

Kofun
History of Gifu Prefecture
Ōno, Gifu
Historic Sites of Japan